Penicillium qii is a species of the genus of Penicillium which was isolated from plant leaves in China.

References 

qii